The 2012 Copa Agco Cordoba was a professional tennis tournament played on clay courts. It was the first edition of the tournament which was part of the 2012 ATP Challenger Tour. It took place in Villa Allende, Argentina between 15 and 21 October 2012.

Singles main draw entrants

Seeds

 1 Rankings are as of October 8, 2012.

Other entrants
The following players received wildcards into the singles main draw:
  Andrea Collarini
  Guillermo Durán
  Juan Ignacio Londero
  Nicolás Massú

The following players received entry from the qualifying draw:
  Juan-Martín Aranguren
  Marcel Felder
  Goran Tošić
  Antal van der Duim

Champions

Singles

 Guillaume Rufin def.  Javier Martí, 6–2, 6–3

Doubles

 Facundo Bagnis /  Diego Junqueira def.  Ariel Behar /  Guillermo Durán, 6–1, 6–2

External links
Official Website

Copa Agco Cordoba
Copa Agco Cordoba